The 4 × 50 metre mixed medley relay competition of the 2014 FINA World Swimming Championships (25 m) was held on 4 December.

Records
Prior to the competition, the existing world and championship records were as follows.

Results

Heats
The heats were held at 12:06.

Final
The final were held at 20:18.

References

4 x 50 metre mixed medley relay
Mixed aquatics